Elephant Mountain is a mountain located in Township C, Oxford County, Maine. Its northeastern end is in Township D, Franklin County. Elephant Mountain is flanked to the northeast by Bemis Mountain, and to the southeast by Old Blue Mountain.

Elephant Mountain stands in the watershed of the Androscoggin River, which drains into Merrymeeting Bay, the estuary of the Kennebec River, and then into the Gulf of Maine. The northwest side of the mountain drains into Metallak Brook, then into Upper and Lower Richardson lakes, the Rapid River, and Umbagog Lake, the source of the Androscoggin. The southwest side of Elephant Mountain drains into Birch Brook and Clearwater Brook, then into Black Brook, and the Ellis River, and the Androscoggin. The southeast side of the mountain drains into Mountain Brook, then into Berdeen Stream, and the Swift River, another tributary of the Androscoggin.

References

See also 
 List of mountains in Maine

Mountains of Oxford County, Maine
Mountains of Franklin County, Maine
New England Hundred Highest
Mountains of Maine